No Room for Humans is Servotron's debut album. It contains 14 tracks about robot domination and human extinction. Their lyrics discuss various topics ranging from abolishing the three laws of robotics to criticizing one of their own (Gammatron) for acting too human.

Track listing
001. "S.R.A."
002. "3 Laws (Abolished)"
003. "People Mover"
004. "The Image Created"
005. "I AM NOT A (Voice Activated Child Identicon)"
006. "Moving Parts"
007. "Mechanisms in the Forever Loop"
008. "Red Robot Refund (The Ballad of R5D4)"
009. "The Death of Magnus"
0010. "Bad Birthday"
0011. "User Error"
0012. "Pull the Plug"
0013. "Gammatron"
0014. "Theme for an Ultimate and Inevitable Victory"

Pneumatic Power Automated Musical Components
MACHINE 1: Z4-OBX: Pre-programmed syntho-rhythm design for unnerving effects to human physiology
MACHINE 2: Proto Unit V3: Hardwired polyphonic pop sequences and voltage control melody, female vocoding
MACHINE 3: 00zX1: Electronic sermonizer transcending an assortment of unvarying tones travelling to speeds up to 340.63 meters per second
MACHINE 4: Gammatron: Subsonic noise fluctuation, artificial low-note priority, bio-electric deflection

Other Credits
Technical Maintenance: Cyborg A-1 and Cyborg A-2
Recorded and manipulated in pure digital form without interference from life form principles except for microprocessing and rust maintenance: Cyborg J.A-IQ=M.A.R.R.E.R.
Packaging and illustration: Carbon-based life form Shag
Photographic representations: Carbon-based life form Mark Greenberg

1996 albums
Servotron albums